The Collón Curá River is a geographical feature of Neuquén Province, Argentina. The Collón Curá Formation and in turn the South American land mammal age Colloncuran are named after the river.

The valley is famous for its two activities: birdwatching and fly fishing.

See also 
 List of rivers of Argentina

References 
 Rand McNally, The New International Atlas, 1993.
  GEOnet Names Server 

Rivers of Neuquén Province
Mapuche language
Rivers of Argentina